Hernando Alfonso Prada Gil (born 6 October 1963) is a Colombian lawyer, university professor and politician. He has served as Colombia's minister of the interior since August 2022.

He was the Private Secretary of the political leader, later assassinated, Luis Carlos Galán during his presidential campaign for the New Liberalism movement. Years later, he served as Councilor of Bogotá for three periods since 1998 with the endorsement of the Liberal Party where his colleagues named him the best Councilor of Bogotá on three occasions based on the evaluation carried out by the Bogotá Chamber of Commerce, the newspaper El Tiempo and the Corona Foundation.

In 2010, he was launched as a representative to the Chamber for the capital of the country with the endorsement of the Green Party, in the period between 2010 and 2014, at which time he was also highlighted by his colleagues and by the RCN Channel as the best Representative to the Chamber of Colombia in 2010.

In 2014 he coordinated the re-election campaign of Juan Manuel Santos in Bogotá. Later, that same year, he was appointed as Director of SENA where he stood out for promoting the internationalization of the entity, achieving international distinctions such as the 2015 Tech Challenge Innovation Fund, delivered by the Government of Barack Obama at the White House.

In March 2017 he was appointed as Secretary General of the Presidency by President Juan Manuel Santos.

He was presented on 6 April 2022, as the head of debate for the presidential candidate for the Historical Pact, Gustavo Petro.

Trajectory 
He began his participation in politics very young, before his 20 years in the liberal movement led by Rafael Amador in Bogotá, and which was part of "galanismo". In that space, he shared and learned from the leader Luis Carlos Galán, who in his campaign for the Presidency in 1982 invited Prada to work with him as his Private Secretary.

In 1997 he was elected councilman of Bogotá for the Colombian Liberal Party. re-elected in 2000 and headed the list for the council in 2003, this time for Enrique Peñalosa's movement The Bogotá we want. In the council he was a speaker and author of projects such as the creation of the Transmilenio mass transportation model, Urban Renewal and the Administrative Department of Public Space. He worked on initiatives on transportation regulations, safety, education, urban development, public services and the Land Management Plan. In 2006 he resigned from the Bogotá Council to run for the Senate of the Republic, but his aspiration did not prosper.

As a result, Prada was appointed director of the District Institute for Recreation and Sports in Bogotá and, later, consultant to the National Government, UNDP and International IDEA.

In 2010, now supported by the movement made up of former mayors Enrique Peñalosa, Luis Eduardo Garzón and Antanas Mockus, he was elected as a representative to the Chamber for Bogotá. In February 2011, he was chosen District Director of the Green Party in Bogotá, and in September 2012 he was appointed by the National Directorate of the Party as President Spokesperson of the community.

He supported the re-election of President Juan Manuel Santos by leading the campaign in Bogotá. In August 2014 he was appointed as Director of SENA, where he became the first general director of the entity to know the 33 regional and 117 training centers, as well as a large number of sub-offices located throughout the national territory.

Between August and October 2016, the official took a leave of absence to work on the Plebiscite for Peace campaign, after which time he returned to the Seine. In March 2017, after appearing in the media as minister of education, justice, labor, agriculture and the interior, he was appointed Secretary General of the Presidency of the Republic on behalf of President Juan Manuel Santos, who highlighted his work in the SIGN. In his speech he quoted "he did a wonderful job. I remember when I took possession of him, I told him: here he gave you the crown jewel, defend it, take advantage of it and deliver that crown jewel even more polished, more valued."

References

1963 births
Living people
Cabinet of Gustavo Petro
Colombian Ministers of the Interior
Politicians from Bogotá
20th-century Colombian politicians
21st-century Colombian politicians